John Gay (1685–1732) was an English poet and dramatist.

John Gay may also refer to:

John Gay (philosopher) (1699–1745), English philosopher
John Gay (photographer) (1909–1999), British photographer
John Gay (runner) (born 1996), Canadian runner
John Gay (screenwriter) (1924–2017), American screenwriter
John Gay (surgeon) (1813–1885), English surgeon

See also
Jonathan Gay (born 1967), computer programmer and software entrepreneur